Andrejs Everitt (born 13 March 1989) is a former professional Australian rules footballer who played for the Western Bulldogs, Sydney Swans and Carlton Football Club in the Australian Football League (AFL). He is the younger brother of former ,  and Sydney player Peter Everitt.

Everitt was picked in the 2006 AFL Draft at pick 11 from the Dandenong Stingrays. At the end of the 2007 AFL season, Andrejs was given Chris Grant's old No. 3 guernsey on Grant's insistence, although the club had contemplated retiring the number.

At the end of the 2010 season, Everitt was traded to the Sydney Swans, in return for Patrick Veszpremi and a late round draft selection.

Andrejs Everitt has a Latvian mother and an Australian father. His mother named him Andrejs in recognition of her Latvian heritage.

In Round 3, Everitt stamped himself as a Swans player, leading the team to victory over the West Coast Eagles with 2 crucial goals in the last quarter.

Everitt also kicked one of the most famous goals at the SCG vs Geelong Cats. with less than a minute to go he kicked a goal from fifty right on the boundary to win it for the Swans.

At the end of the 2013 season, Everitt was traded to the Carlton Football Club. He spent three seasons with Carlton, playing a total of 52 games. He finished as the club's leading goalkicker in 2015 with 31 goals, but struggled with form in 2016 and was delisted in October. He subsequently announced his retirement from AFL football in November.

Everitt will return to play and co-coach at Somerville in the Mornington Peninsula Nepean Football League, his local club when he was a junior, from 2017.

Statistics

|- style="background-color: #EAEAEA"
! scope="row" style="text-align:center" | 2007
|
| 29 || 8 || 4 || 4 || 66 || 43 || 109 || 33 || 14 || 0.5 || 0.5 || 8.3 || 5.4 || 13.6 || 4.1 || 1.8 || 0
|-
! scope="row" style="text-align:center" | 2008
|
| 3 || 9 || 0 || 0 || 71 || 41 || 112 || 33 || 15 || 0.0 || 0.0 || 7.9 || 4.6 || 12.4 || 3.7 || 1.7 || 0
|- style="background-color: #EAEAEA"
! scope="row" style="text-align:center" | 2009
|
| 3 || 7 || 1 || 2 || 50 || 40 || 90 || 30 || 13 || 0.1 || 0.3 || 7.1 || 5.7 || 12.9 || 4.3 || 1.9 || 0
|-
! scope="row" style="text-align:center" | 2010
|
| 3 || 12 || 3 || 5 || 102 || 90 || 192 || 69 || 28 || 0.3 || 0.4 || 8.5 || 7.5 || 16.0 || 5.8 || 2.3 || 0
|- style="background-color: #EAEAEA"
! scope="row" style="text-align:center" | 2011
|
| 13 || 11 || 8 || 5 || 66 || 28 || 94 || 40 || 18 || 0.7 || 0.5 || 6.0 || 2.5 || 8.5 || 3.6 || 1.6 || 0
|-
! scope="row" style="text-align:center" | 2012
|
| 13 || 12 || 9 || 8 || 66 || 50 || 116 || 17 || 25 || 0.8 || 0.7 || 5.5 || 4.2 || 9.7 || 1.4 || 2.1 || 0
|- style="background-color: #EAEAEA"
! scope="row" style="text-align:center" | 2013
|
| 13 || 20 || 7 || 3 || 169 || 139 || 308 || 78 || 37 || 0.4 || 0.2 || 8.5 || 7.0 || 15.4 || 3.9 || 1.9 || 0
|-
! scope="row" style="text-align:center" | 2014
|
| 33 || 17 || 13 || 7 || 160 || 126 || 286 || 89 || 38 || 0.8 || 0.4 || 9.4 || 7.4 || 16.8 || 5.2 || 2.2 || 3
|- style="background:#eaeaea;"
! scope="row" style="text-align:center" | 2015
|
| 33 || 22 || 31 || 20 || 225 || 109 || 334 || 132 || 30 || 1.4 || 0.9 || 10.2 || 5.0 || 15.2 || 6.0 || 1.4 || 0
|-
! scope="row" style="text-align:center" | 2016
|
| 33 || 13 || 17 || 8 || 99 || 81 || 180 || 67 || 17 || 1.3 || 0.6 || 7.6 || 6.2 || 13.8 || 5.2 || 1.3 || 2
|- class="sortbottom"
! colspan=3| Career
! 131
! 93
! 62
! 1074
! 747
! 1821
! 588
! 235
! 0.7
! 0.5
! 8.2
! 5.7
! 13.9
! 4.5
! 1.8
! 5
|}

References

External links

Sydney Swans players
Western Bulldogs players
Carlton Football Club players
1989 births
Living people
Australian rules footballers from Melbourne
Dandenong Stingrays players
Australian people of Latvian descent
Preston Football Club (VFA) players
People from Hastings, Victoria
People from the City of Knox